The 1980 San Francisco 49ers season was the franchise's 31st season in the National Football League and their 35th overall. This was both Bill Walsh's and Joe Montana's second season with the team. The 49ers looked to improve on their previous output of 2–14 (which they had earned in both of the two previous seasons). They failed to make the playoffs for the eighth consecutive season, but they did improve to 6–10.

On December 7, 1980, the 49ers staged the then greatest come from behind victory in the history of the NFL's regular season. The 49ers rallied from 28 points down to defeat the New Orleans Saints by a score of 38–35 in Week Fourteen. This was the last full season until 1999 that the 49ers would finish with fewer than 10 wins.

Personnel

Staff

Roster

Schedule

Game summaries

Week 14: vs. New Orleans Saints 

The 49ers fought back from a 28-point deficit in the second half to win in overtime 38–35. The game was named as #8 on NFL Top 10 on Top Ten Comebacks.

Week 16

Standings

References 

San Francisco 49ers seasons
San Francisco
1980 in San Francisco
San